John Ashburnham, 2nd Earl of Ashburnham, PC (30 October 1724 – 8 April 1812), styled Viscount St Asaph from 1730 to 1737, was a British peer and courtier.

Early life
Ashburnham was the only son of John Ashburnham, 1st Earl of Ashburnham, by his third wife, Jemima Grey, the daughter of the 1st Duke of Kent, a prominent courtier.

Career
In 1737, he inherited his father's titles and became a Lord of the Bedchamber in 1748.

From 1753 to 1762, Ashburnham was Keeper of Hyde Park and St. James's Park and Lord Lieutenant of Sussex from 1754 to 1757. In 1765, he was appointed Master of the Great Wardrobe, and Groom of the Stole in 1775.

In 1767, he acquired estates in Chelsea from Sir Richard Glyn, and had his residence at Ashburnham House on Lots Lane. He sold the estate to the widowed Lady Mary Coke in 1786.

Personal life
On 25 June 1756, Ashburnham married Elizabeth Crowley  (1727–1781), a daughter and co-heiress of Alderman John Crowley , of Barking, Suffolk, a wealthy London merchant, and a son of Sir Ambrose Crowley. Her dowry was £200,000. Elizabeth's mother was Theodosia, daughter of Revd. Joseph Gascoygne. They had six children:

George, styled Viscount St Asaph (1 February 1758 – 1758).
Lady Henrietta Theodosia (1759–1847), died unmarried.
George, styled Viscount St Asaph (1760–1830), later 3rd Earl of Ashburnham.
Lady Jemima Elizabeth (1762–1786), married James Graham, 3rd Duke of Montrose.
Lady Elizabeth Frances (1763–1854), died unmarried.
Lady Theodosia Maria (1765–1822), married Robert Vyner.

Lord Ashburnham died on 8 April 1812 and was succeeded by his son George.

References

|-

|-

|-

|-

|-

1724 births
1812 deaths
Earls of Ashburnham
Lord-Lieutenants of Sussex
Members of the Privy Council of Great Britain
Grooms of the Stool
Court of George III of the United Kingdom